Calceolaria cana, the salsilla or zarcilla, is a species of flowering plant in the pocketbook plant genus Calceolaria, family Calceolariaceae, native to central Chile. Along with Calceolaria corymbosa and Calceolaria crenatiflora it has contributed to the Calceolaria Herbeohybrida Group of cultivars.

References

cana
Endemic flora of Chile
Flora of central Chile
Plants described in 1799
Taxa named by Antonio José Cavanilles